The following is a partial list of teams of superheroes from various comic books, television shows, and other sources.

DC Comics 

 All-Star Squadron
 Atomic Knights 
 Birds of Prey (NOTE: This is the title of the comic series; the group itself does not have a formal name, though Lady Blackhawk suggested Birds of Prey as the group's name)
 Challengers of the Unknown
 New Challengers
 Champions of Angor
 Darkstars
 Doom Patrol
 The Elite
 Extreme Justice
 Forever People
 Freedom Fighters
 Global Guardians
 Golden Guardians
 Green Lantern Corps
 Inferior Five
 Infinity Inc.
 Justice League Unlimited
 Justice League of America
 Justice League Antarctica
 Justice League Detroit
 Justice League Elite
 Justice League Europe
Justice League International
Justice League Task Force
 Justice Legion Alpha
 Justice Riders
Justice Society of America
Justice Society International 
 Legion of Superheroes
 Legion Espionage Squad
 Legion of Substitute Heroes
 Legion of Super-Pets
 Lieutenant Marvels
 The Marvel Family
 The Terrifics
 The Immortal Men
 The Unexpected
Masters of the Universe
 Metal Men
 Omega Men
The Others
 The Outsiders
 Princess of Power 
 Secret Six
 Section 8
 Sentinels of Magic
 Seven Soldiers of Victory
 Shadowpact
 Sovereign Seven
 Squadron of Justice
 Star Sapphire
 Stormwatch
 Suicide Squad
 Super Buddies
 Super Friends
 Teen Titans
 Teen Titans West
 Team 7
 Young Justice
 Zoo Crew
 Red Hood and the Outlaws
 Indigo Tribe
 Violet Lantern Corps
 Blue Lantern Corps
 Ultimen

America's Best Comics 
 League of Extraordinary Gentlemen
 Top 10
 SMASH
 Strongmen of America

Impact 
 American Crusaders
 Crusaders
 The Web

Milestone Media 
 Blood Syndicate
 Heroes
 Shadow Cabinet

WildStorm 
 The Authority
 The Boys
 Gen¹³
 Liberty Squad
 Planetary
 Paladins
 Savant Garde
 Stormwatch
 Team 7
 Team One
 Wildcore
 Wetworks
 WildC.A.T.S.
 Wildsiderz

Marvel Comics 

 A-Force
 A-Team
 Advocates
 All-Winners Squad
 Alpha Flight
 Annihilators
 Astonishing Avengers
 Avengers
 Avengers A.I
 Avengers of the Supernatural
 Avengers Unity Division
 Captain America Corps
 Champions (1975 team)
 Champions (2016 team)
 The Chosen
 Cosmic Avengers
 Dark Ultimates
 Deadpool Corps
 Defenders
 Earth Force
 Excalibur 
 Exiles (Marvel Comics)
 Fallen Angels
 Fantastic Five
 Fantastic Force 
 Fantastic Four
 Fearless Defenders
 Force Works
 Future Foundation
 Generation X
 Genext
 God Squad
 Great Lakes Avengers
 Guardians of the Galaxy (1969 team)
 Guardians of the Galaxy (2008 team)
 The Hand
 Heroes for Hire
 Inhumans
 Invaders
 Kiss (band)
 Last Defenders
 League of Losers
 Legion of Monsters
 Marvel Knights
 New Avengers
 New Mutants
 New Warriors
 New X-Men (2001 series)
 New X-Men (2004 series)
 Next Avengers
 Nextwave
 Nick Fury's Howling Commandos
 Nova Corps
 Omega Flight
 Outlaws
 Phoenix Five 
 Power Pack
 Runaways
 S.H.I.E.L.D.
 Savage Avengers
 Secret Avengers
 Secret Defenders
 Secret Warriors
 Shi'ar Imperial Guard
 Slingers
 Sorcerers Supreme
 Squadron Supreme
 Thor Corps
 Thunderbolts
 Thundercats
 U.S. Avengers
 Ultimate Knights
 Ultimate X-Men
 Ultimates
 Uncanny X-Men
 Web Warriors
 West Coast Avengers
 West Coast Ultimates
 X-Babies
 X-Ceptionals
 X-Club
 X-Corporation
 X-Corps
 X-Factor
 X-Factor Investigations
 X-Force
 X-Men
 X-Men 2099
 X-Nation 2099
 X-Patriots
 X-People
 X-Punks
 X-Saviours
 X-Statix
 X-Terminated
 X-Terminators
 X-Ternals
 Young Allies
 Young Avengers
 Young X-Men

Ultraverse
 Exiles
 Freex
 The Strangers
 Ultraforce

Malibu Comics 
 Protectors

New Universe 
 DP 7
 Kickers, Inc.
 Psi-Force
 Spitfire and the Troubleshooters

Epic Comics 
 Strikeforce: Morituri

Razorline 
 Hyperkind

King in Black 
 The Union

Image Comics 

 Actioneers
Capes, Inc
Danger Girl
 Deadly Duo
 Dynamo 5
Fighting Force
Firebirds
Freak Force
 Global Defense Agency
 Guardians of the Globe
 Liberty League
The League of Honor
Omega One
The Nobles
 The Pact
 Special Operations Strikeforce
Teen Team
Ultra Mega Super Five
Underground Freaks
 Wildguard 
Wolf C.O.R.P.S.

Top Cow 

 Cyber Force
 Codename: Strykeforce
Liberty Balance

Awesome Comics 

 Youngblood
 Brigade
 New Men
 Allied Supermen of America
 Bloodpool
 Bloodstrike
New Force
Operation: Knightstrike
League of Infinity

Big Bang Comics 

 Knights of Justice
Pantheon of Heroes 
Round table of America
Verdict
Whiz Kids

Dark Horse Comics 
 The End League
 Bureau for Paranormal Research and Defense
 Kiss
 Umbrella Academy

Comics' Greatest World 

 Catalyst

Legend 

 Next Men

Valiant Comics 
 Archer and Armstrong
 Armorines
 Harbingers
 H.A.R.D. Corps
 Quantum & Woody
 Psi Lords
 Punx
 Rai and the Future Force
 Secret Weapons
 Trinity Angels
 Trouble Makers
 Unity

Boom! Studios 
 Planetary Brigade
The Hypernaturals
 Paradigm

FAB Comics 
 Shadow Warriors
 Peace Makers
 Fabulous Five

Other independent 
 Adolescent Radioactive Blackbelt Hamsters
 The Atomics
 The DNAgents
 Digvbc
 Elementals
 Femforce
 Freedom Force
 Frenetic Five
 Hero Alliance
 The Honor Guard and the First Family of Astro City
 The Incarnations
 Justice Machine
 The Legion of Net.Heroes
 Mighty Crusaders
 Mighty Mutanimals
 Neo-Knights
 Sign Gene: The First Deaf Superheroes
 SuperFuckers
 The New League of Heroes
 The New Wave (comics)
Team Superpowers of Project Superpowers 
 Teenage Mutant Ninja Turtles
 Terrific Three
 T.H.U.N.D.E.R. Agents
 WorldWatch

Hanna-Barbera / Cartoon Network 
 Arabian Knights
 Astro and the Space Mutts
 Crystal Gems
 Drak Pack
 Galaxy Trio
 The Herculoids
 The Impossibles
 The Justice Lords (alternate reality Justice League (TV series))
 The Justice Friends
 The Kids Next Door organization
 The Powerpuff Girls
 Speedracer 
 Super Friends (Hanna-Barbera's version of the JLA)
 The Super Globetrotters
 SWAT Kats
 Teen Force
 ThunderCats
 Time Squad
 Underfist
 Ben's Team (Ben 10)

Anime / manga 
 Experts of Justice
 Gatchaman
 Gatchaman Crowds
 Hero Association
 The Knight Sabers
 Magic Knight Rayearth
 The Sailor Guardians
 The Z Warriors
 Tokyo Mew Mew
 ThunderCats
 Straw Hat Pirates
 Galaxy Angel
 Yatterman
 Shinigami
 Libra
 Kekkaishi
 The Allied Shinobi Forces (Naruto)
 Gotei 13
 Arrancar
 Espada 10
 5 Kage
 Jetman
 Fairy Tail Guild
 Ronin Warriors
 Team 7 (Naruto)
 The Konoha 11 (Naruto)
 My Hero Academia
 Pretty Cure

TV

A
 The Adventures of Batman 68–69
 The All-New Super Friends Hour 77–78
 Alphas (2011–2012)
 Alpha Flight
 Angel Investigations
 Agent Carter (2015–2016)
 Agents of S.H.I.E.L.D. (2013–2020)
 Aqua Teen Hunger Force
 The Aquabats (The Aquabats! Super Show!)
 Arrow (2012–2020)
 Astro Boy (2003–2004)
 Autobots
 The Avengers: Earth's Mightiest Heroes (2010–2012)
 The Avengers

B
 Batman 1966 – 1969
 Batman: The Animated Series 1992–1995
 Batman Beyond 1999–2001
 The Batman/Superman Hour 68–69
 The Batman/Tarzan Adventure Hour 77–78
 Batman Unlimited (2005–present)
 Ben 10 2005-008
 Beware the Batman July 13, 2013 – September 28, 2014
 The Beetleborgs
 Biker Mice from Mars
 Black Scorpion (2001)
 Bionic Six
 Bionic Woman 76–78 & 07
 Birds of Prey
 Blue Falcon
 Buffy the Vampire Slayer (1997)

C
 Captain Caveman & the Teen Angels 77–80
 Captain Planet and the Planeteers
 The N Team
 The Care Bears 85–88
 The Centurions
 Challenge of the Super Friends September 9 – December 23, 1978
 Chouseishin 03-08
 Code Lyoko 03-07
 Coon and Friends from South Park

D
 Daredevil (2015–present)
 Defenders of the Earth
 Dick Tracy (1937)
 Dick Tracy Returns (1938)
 Dick Tracy's G-Men (1939)
 Doom Patrol (2019–present)

E
 Electra Woman and Dyna Girl (1976–77)
 Extreme Dinosaurs

F
 Fantastic 4
 Flash (2014–present)
 Flash Gordon (1936)
 Flash Gordon’s Trip to Mars (1938)
 Faded (2017)

G
 The Galaxy Rangers
 Gotham (2014–present)
 The Greatest American Hero (1981–83)
 The Green Hornet (1966–67)

H
 Heroes (2006–10)

J
 Jake 2.0 03-04
 Jedi
 Jessica Jones (2015)
 Justice League
 Justice League Action (Fall 2016)
 Justice League of America (failed pilot for a live-action series)
 Justice League: Gods and Monsters Chronicles (June 2015)
 Justice League Unlimited

K
 Kiss (band)
 Kamen Rider

L
 The League of Extraordinary Gentlemen
 Legends of Tomorrow (2016–present)
 The Loonatics
 The League of Incredible Vegetables

M
 Manhattan Clan
 Manimal (1983)
 Masters of the Universe
 Men in Black
 Mermaid Man and Barnacle Boy (from SpongeBob SquarePants)
 Metal Heroes
 The Mighty Heroes
 Mighty Mouse 87–88
 Misfits
 Misfits of Science (80's)
 Mutant X
 The Mystic Knights

N
 The New Adventures of Batman (February 12 – May 28, 1977)
 The New Batman Adventures 1997–1999
 The New Batman/Superman Adventures (September 13, 1997 – February 12, 2000)
 Nightman 97–99
 The New Justice Team

P
 Preacher (2017–present)
 Power Rangers
 The Power Puff Girls (1998)

R
 The Real Ghostbusters

S
 Samurai Pizza Cats
 SilverHawks
 The Six Million Dollar Man 74–78
 Spectral Knights
 Smallville 2001
 The Spectacular Spider-man (2008)
 Spider-Friends
 The Spider's Web (1938)
 Street Sharks
 Superboy (1988–1992)
 The Superman/Batman Adventures 1960s
 Superman: The Animated Series (1996)
 Super Friends – (1973 – 74 TV series)
 Super Friends – 1980–1982 seasons
 Super Friends: The Legendary Super Powers Show – 1984–1985 season
 Supergirl (2015)
 The Super Powers Team: Galactic Guardians – 1985–1986 season
 Super Sentai
 Superhuman Samurai Syber-Squad
 Sarah Solano 19–90

T
 Tattooed Teenage Alien Fighters from Beverly Hills
 Team Avatar
 Teamo Supremo
 Teenage Mutant Ninja Turtles
 Teen Titans
 ThunderCats
 The Tick (2001–02)
 Titans (2018–present)
 The Tomorrow People
 Toxic Crusaders
 Totally Spies
 The Thundermans
 The Freedom Pals from South Park

U
 Ultraman

W
 Wild C.A.T.s
 Wild West C.O.W.-Boys of Moo Mesa
 Wolverine and the X-Men (2009)
 The World's Greatest Super Friends – 1979–1980 season
 Wonder Woman (1975
 Winx Club

V
 VR Troopers

X
 X-Men

Y
 Young Justice (2010)

Film 
 Autobots (from both the animated & live action films based upon Transformers)
 Big Hero 6
 The Incredibles
 Jedi
 Kiss (band) (Kiss Meets the Phantom of the Park and Scooby-Doo! and Kiss: Rock and Roll Mystery)
 Masters of the Universe
 Mystery Men
 Sign Gene
 Sky High
 The Specials
 The Super Capers
 ThunderCats
 Team Zenith

Other 
The Aquabats
Battletoads
The Mighty Ducks
The Order of the Phoenix
The Order of the Stone (Minecraft: Story Mode)
Sora, Donald and Goofy in Kingdom Hearts video game franchise
Overwatch
Super Robot Monkey Team Hyperforce Go!
The Regulators
ThunderCats
Turbo-Man
Space Squad
 Team RWBY

References 

Superhero teams and groups, List of
 Teams and groups, List of superhero